Pedro Alfonzo Rodríguez González (born September 25, 1968) is a Puerto Rican politician from the Popular Democratic Party (PPD). Rodríguez was elected to the Senate of Puerto Rico in 2012. He also served as member of the House of Representatives of Puerto Rico in two separate instances (2001–2009 and 2011–2013), the last one to fill the vacancy left by Luis Farinacci.

Early years and studies

Pedro A. Rodríguez was born in San Juan on September 25, 1968. He has a bachelor's degree in political science from the Interamerican University of Puerto Rico.

Professional career

Since the mid-90s, Rodríguez has worked as a retailer.

Political career

Rodríguez began his political career in 1993, when he was elected to the Municipal Assembly of Trujillo Alto.

In 2000, Rodríguez was elected to the House of Representatives for District 38 at the general elections. In 2004, he was reelected and remained in the position until 2008, when he was defeated by the PNP candidate.

On March 3, 2011, with the resignation of Representative Luis Farinacci to the House of Representatives surfaced, Rodríguez became a representative again because of the Minority Law. As representative, he became speaker of his party in the Commissions of Sports and Recreation, and Youth Affairs. He also served as member of the Commissions of the Development of the Tourist Industry, Retirement Systems, and Transportation.

Rodríguez decided to run for a seat in the Senate of Puerto Rico under the Popular Democratic Party (PPD) at the 2012 elections. After winning a spot on the 2012 primaries, he was elected to represent the District of Carolina.

See also
25th Senate of Puerto Rico

References

External links
 Pedro A. Rodríguez Biography on WAPA-TV

1968 births
Living people
Interamerican University of Puerto Rico alumni
Members of the Senate of Puerto Rico
People from Trujillo Alto, Puerto Rico
Popular Democratic Party (Puerto Rico) politicians